Jefferson Township is one of the fourteen townships of Mercer County, Ohio, United States.  The 2000 census found 13,231 people in the township, 2,928 of whom lived in the unincorporated portions of the township.

Geography
Located in the east central part of the county, it borders the following townships:
Hopewell Township - north, west of Center Township
Center Township - north, east of Hopewell Township
Noble Township, Auglaize County - northeast
Saint Marys Township, Auglaize County - southeast
Franklin Township - south, east of Butler Township
Butler Township - south, west of Franklin Township
Washington Township - southwest
Liberty Township - northwest

The city of Celina, the county seat of Mercer County, is located in central Jefferson Township, and Grand Lake St. Marys occupies the township's southeastern quarter.

Name and history
Jefferson Township was organized around 1839. It is one of twenty-four Jefferson Townships statewide.

Government
The township is governed by a three-member board of trustees, who are elected in November of odd-numbered years to a four-year term beginning on the following January 1. Two are elected in the year after the presidential election and one is elected in the year before it. There is also an elected township fiscal officer, who serves a four-year term beginning on April 1 of the year after the election, which is held in November of the year before the presidential election. Vacancies in the fiscal officership or on the board of trustees are filled by the remaining trustees.

References

External links
County website
Township website

Townships in Mercer County, Ohio
Townships in Ohio